The black sunbird (Leptocoma sericea) is a species of bird in the family Nectariniidae.
It is found in eastern Indonesia and New Guinea.
Its natural habitats are subtropical or tropical moist lowland forest and subtropical or tropical mangrove forest.

Description
It is a small songbird with a long down-curved bill and iridescent body. The black sunbird has a lifespan of approximately 3.6 years. The coloring of the birds differentiate between male and female. The male black sunbird is midnight black in color with an iridescent blue-purple stripe across the upper chest. There is a crown of lustrous green on the head, while the wings and tail are glossed blue. In many regions, the throat area is iridescent reddish-purple; however, moving northward it shifts towards a bluish sparkle (Moluccas and Kai Islands). The female black sunbird has a completely different color complex than her male counterpart. Her coloration across the chest and body is dusted greenish-yellow. The wings are smothered brown as well as the head. In northern areas, the color of the female black sunbird is “nondescript,” with a charcoal colored head, with an olive-green upper-body and yellow underbody. The juvenile black sunbird resembles the female sunbird with more of a distinct yellow throat.

Taxonomy

Animalia, chordata, aves, passeriformes, nectariniidae, leptocoma

Specific name: Leptocoma aspasia

Habitat

Its natural habitats are subtropical or tropical moist lowland forest and subtropical or tropical mangrove forest. The black sunbird prefers a variety of forest types, especially at the forest edge. They are common in coconut plantations and other cultivations, such as shrubs and gardens.

Diet

These birds forage for various arthropods, as well as fruit and nectar from flowers and trees. They often forage alone, in pairs or family groups, and occasionally they’re found in larger flocks; rarely do they join mixed-species flocks. They’re very active throughout their forage. The birds obtain most of their food from gleaning, and hover-gleaning as they catch their food from out the air.

Song and sounds

The song and sound is a rapid, sweet cadence lasting 1.5-4 seconds in duration. It consists of single or a series of high-pitched sibilant notes; rapid fire double notes, one is higher than the other, clear hallow peep; a rapid slurred, shrill zi-zi-zi-ziclosing with the flight call pit-pit-pit.

Breeding

The black sunbird was recorded laying in August and September in Sulawesi, March and May-January on islands of Papua New Guinea.

Gallery

Subspecies

1. Leptocoma aspasia talautensi

2. Leptocoma aspasia sangirensis

3. Leptocoma aspasia grayi

4. Leptocoma aspasia porphyrolaema

5. Leptocoma aspasia auriceps

6. Leptocoma aspasia auricapilla

7. Leptocoma aspasia proserpina

8. Leptocoma aspasia aspasioides

9. Leptocoma aspasia chlorolaema

10. Leptocoma aspasia aspasia

11. Leptocoma aspasia vincina

12. Leptocoma aspasia mariae

13. Leptocoma aspasia cochrani

14. Leptocoma aspasia maforensis

15. Leptocoma aspasia salvadorii

16. Leptocoma aspasia mysorensis

17. Leptocoma aspasia nigriscapularis

18. Leptocoma aspasia veronica

19. Leptocoma aspasia cornelia

20. Leptocoma aspasia christianae 

21. Leptocoma aspasia caeruleogula

22. Leptocoma aspasia corinna

23. Leptocoma aspasia eichhorni

References

black sunbird
Birds of Sulawesi
Birds of the Maluku Islands
Birds of New Guinea
black sunbird
Taxonomy articles created by Polbot
Taxobox binomials not recognized by IUCN